Wenche Frogn Sellæg (born 12 August 1937) is a Norwegian politician for the Conservative Party, and between 1981 and 1989 a parliamentary representative for Nord-Trøndelag. She was Minister of Environmental Affairs 1981–1983, Minister of Justice 1985–1986, and Minister of Social Affairs 1989–1990.

She played 42 matches as goalkeeper for the Norwegian national handball team from 1959 to 1968.

References

1937 births
Living people
Government ministers of Norway
Ministers of Climate and the Environment of Norway
Members of the Storting
Conservative Party (Norway) politicians
Norwegian female handball players
Women government ministers of Norway
20th-century Norwegian women politicians
20th-century Norwegian politicians
Women members of the Storting
Female justice ministers
Ministers of Justice of Norway